Valuyki is the name of several inhabited localities in Russia.

Urban localities
Valuyki, Belgorod Oblast, a town in Belgorod Oblast

Rural localities
Valuyki, Moscow Oblast, a village in Teryayevskoye Rural Settlement of Volokolamsky District of Moscow Oblast
Valuyki, Tver Oblast, a village in Staritsky District of Tver Oblast